Paul Stewart Williamson (born November 1948) is a retired Anglo-Catholic priest in the Church of England. He has brought a number of high-profile and controversial civil suits in English courts over matters of Anglican faith and practice, including the ordination of women to the priesthood, the legality of the marriage of Charles, Prince of Wales to Camilla, Duchess of Cornwall and has challenged the retirement age of 70 within the Church of England.

He is not to be confused with the English art historian of the same name, a specialist in medieval ivories long a curator at the Victoria & Albert Museum in London.

Early life and education
Williamson was born in 1948. He studied theology at King's College London, and graduated in 1971 with a Bachelor of Divinity (BD) degree and the Associateship of King's College (AKC).

Ordained ministry
Williamson was ordained in the Church of England as a deacon in 1972 and as a priest in 1973. From 1972 to 1975, he served his curacy at St Paul's, Deptford in the Diocese of Southwark. He was an honorary curate of St John the Divine, Kennington between 1976 and 1977.

In 1978, Williamson moved to the Diocese of London. He served as a curate at Holy Trinity with St Mary, Hoxton from 1978 to 1983, at All Saints, Margaret Street from 1983 to 1984, and at St Mary's, Willesden from 1984 to 1985. For the next three years, he was not attached to any parish but held permission to officiate in the diocese. In 1989, he joined St George's Church, Hanworth as a curate. Since 1992, he was the priest-in-charge of St George's.

Williamson is an Anglo-Catholic. He is a member of the Society of Mary.

Activism
Williamson is a well-known opponent of the ordination of women to the priesthood. In 1997 he sued the dean and chapter of St Paul's Cathedral for appointing a woman as a minor canon. On 16 July 1997, he was declared to be a vexatious litigant by Mr Justice Christopher Rose at the Royal Courts of Justice. As a result, he is no longer allowed to bring action within the Courts of England and Wales without obtaining the prior permission of a judge.

In 2005, Williamson protested against the legality of the marriage of Charles, Prince of Wales to Camilla, Duchess of Cornwall.

In 2011, with others, Williamson challenged a major grant by the Confraternity of the Blessed Sacrament to the Personal Ordinariate of Our Lady of Walsingham. The Charity Commission for England and Wales, which described the complainants as "a substantial number", subsequently ruled that the grant had been unlawful.

On 26 January 2015, Williamson interrupted the consecration service for the Church of England's first woman to become a bishop, Libby Lane, at York Minster. His objection was responded to by John Sentamu, Archbishop of York (who was officiating) and the service continued.

Williamson's initial application to challenge the Church of England's compulsory retirement age of 70 was dismissed by the Employment Tribunal on 8 January 2020 because he had not obtained the prior permission of the High Court under the terms of the vexatious litigant order.

References

External links
 "Frailty, thy name is Williamson", by Andrew Brown, The Independent, 15 April 1997
 "Dr Carey and the Glorious Battle"
 "Vicar wins royal wedding inquiry", The Times, 2 March 2005
 "Charity Commission asked to investigate grant to Ordinariate", Thinking Anglicans website

1950 births
21st-century English Anglican priests
Living people
English Anglo-Catholics
20th-century English Anglican priests
Church of England priests
Alumni of King's College London
Anglo-Catholic clergy
Vexatious litigants